Paysach J. Krohn (born January 29, 1945) is an Orthodox Jewish rabbi, mohel (practitioner of ritual Jewish circumcision), author, and lecturer on topics related to ethics and spiritual growth. He is the author of the "Maggid" series of books for ArtScroll, inspired by the stories of Rabbi Sholom Schwadron, who was known as the "Maggid of Yerushalayim". He also authored a seminal  work on bris milah (religious circumcision), also published by ArtScroll.

Early life
Krohn was born in the Williamsburg neighborhood of Brooklyn, New York. His father, Rabbi Avrohom Zelig Krohn, was a mohel in Brooklyn. He decided to build a practice in Queens and found a job in a hospital there. He moved his family to Kew Gardens when Paysach was seven years old. Paysach was one of the leaders of the Kew Gardens Pirchei boys choir.

Relationship with Rav Sholom Schwadron
Krohn is well known as the author of a series of "Maggid" books inspired by the stories of Rabbi Sholom Schwadron, who was known as the "Maggid of Jerusalem" for the inspirational mussar talks he gave every Friday night from 1952 to 1992 to the public at the Zikhron Moshe shtiebel in Jerusalem. Krohn met Schwadron when his father invited Schwadron to stay with them during one of his frequent fund-raising trips to America in late 1964, although Schwadron didn't know him or his family personally. Schwadron insisted on paying rent, which Krohn agreed to reluctantly. During the five months that Schwadron resided with the Krohns, a close bond formed between him and the family. When Schwadron announced that he was leaving after Passover 1965 to travel back to Israel by boat, the entire family saw him off at the pier. Then Krohn's father handed Schwadron an envelope containing all the "rent money" he had paid, as he had never intended to keep it. A few days later, Krohn's father said he missed his guest so much that he decided to greet him when his boat docked in Israel. He and his wife quickly arranged passports and flew to Israel two days before Schwadron arrived. After giving the Schwadron family time for a reunion, the Krohns appeared with their own welcome.

Avrohom Zelig Krohn was diagnosed with a terminal illness after this event, and died the following year. Six months later, the family received a letter from Schwadron saying that he was coming to America again. Schwadron became a surrogate father to Krohn's seven orphans. He showed great sensitivity towards Krohn's widow, remembering his own mother's struggles to raise her orphaned children.

With Schwadron's encouragement and active input, Paysach Krohn penned the first of his popular "Maggid" books, The Maggid Speaks, published in 1987. Schwadron died before the publication of the second book in the series, Around the Maggid's Table. Subsequent titles (Along the Maggid's Journey, In the Footsteps of the Maggid, Echoes of the Maggid, Reflections of the Maggid etc.) memorialized Schwadron's influence on the overall project.  As of 2012, Krohn has published eight books in the series.

Mohel
Krohn is a fifth-generation mohel. When his father became ill, Paysach learned this skill, in order to support his family. At age 21, he was the youngest mohel ever certified by the Brith Milah Board of New York. He has performed thousands of religious circumcisions. His ceremonies have been described  "exceptionally spiritual and inspirational".

Other activities
Krohn is a well-known lecturer, sharing stories in the manner of a maggid and also collecting stories for his speeches and books. He also leads Jewish historical tours throughout Europe, speaking about the rich and vibrant Jewish communities that existed prior to World War II. He documented the first of these trips in his 2007 book, Traveling with the Maggid.

Along with Esther Jungreis, Krohn has served as a guest speaker at the annual Shavuot retreat hosted by Gateways since 2005. 

In December 2004, Krohn launched the organization PaL (Phone and Learn) in the United Kingdom. A division of Partners in Torah in the U.S., PaL matches up Jews who want to learn more about their heritage with a friendly, knowledgeable tutor for up to an hour a week of Jewish study and discussion over the phone.

Personal
Krohn's wife, Miriam, is one of the principals of Shevach High School in Kew Gardens Hills, Queens, New York.

Works

Yad Eliezer : a collection of various halachos, mitzvos and minhagim pertinent to left-handers 1996|origyear=1st ed. December 1990|publisher=Self-published}}

Audio lectures
Click here to download MP3 shiurim by Rabbi Paysach Krohn

Interview with Rabbi Paysach Krohn by Chazaq's Rabbi Yaniv Meirov: https://www.youtube.com/watch?v=_6AxmVEpVkM

References

External links
 Rabbi Paysach Krohn - Mohel Page
 Phone and Learn (PaL)
 Audio Shiurim on Kol HaLashon
 Video Shiurim on Toldos Yeshurun
“Baseball Heroes” by Rabbi Paysach Krohn

American Haredi rabbis
Jewish American writers
Mohels
Living people
1945 births
People from Williamsburg, Brooklyn
People from Kew Gardens, Queens
20th-century American rabbis
21st-century American rabbis